The Samkhya Pravachana Sutra is a collection of major Sanskrit texts of the Samkhya school of Hindu philosophy. It includes the ancient Samkhya Sutra of Kapila, Samkhya karika of Ishvarakrishna, Samkhya Sutra Vritti of Aniruddha, the Bhasya (commentary) of Vijnana Bhikshu, the Vrittisara of Vedantin Mahadeva, Tattva Samasa and commentary of Narendra, and works of Gaudapada, Vachaspati Mishra, and Panchashikha.

The text provides foundational doctrines of one of the influential schools of Hindu philosophy, such as "nothing can come out of nothing, and nothing can altogether vanish out of existence" in its doctrine of Sat-Karya-Siddhanta, a debate on the two theories for the origin of the world - the creationists (Abhava Utpatti) and the evolutionists (Vivarta, changing from one state to another), the doctrine of Parinama (transformation), among others.

Samkhya Pravachana Sutra is also known as Samkhya Sutra.

Contents
It describes the philosophy of the Samkhya school. The edition that survives in modern times is dated to the 14th century.

The text consists of six chapters. The first three describe core Samkhya doctrines, the fourth chapter describes stories for illustration of the doctrines, the fifth reviews arguments and challenge by rival Indian philosophies particularly Buddhism on one side and Theistic philosophy on the other side, then provides its analysis and answers to those challenges. The last chapter recapitulates its thesis, summarizes its main points and makes conclusions. Major sections and thesis presented in the text include (not exhaustive):

Samkhya is a Moksha Shastra
Samkhya is the only true Advaita Shastra
Samkhya is not in conflict with the Vedas
The Samkhya plurality of Self (soul) versus the Vedanta unity of Self
Definition of Supreme Good
Thesis on Suffering - what it is, and why it happens
Scripture is inadequate means to enlightenment
Theory of bondage; Bondage is not natural
Theory of Naimittika
Purusha and Prakṛti
Theory and nature of Prakriti
Theory of conjunction
Theory of Vidya and Avidya
The problem with Sunyavada, Theory of void and its criticism
Theory of Aviveka
Doctrines of Yoga and Vedanta
Theory of learning and reasoning, limits of reason
Theory of spiritual intuition
Theory of Gunas
Twenty five tattvas
The enumeration theory of Samkhya and Garbha, Prasna and Maitreya Upanishads
Theory of Tanmatras
Ahamkara (ego) and its nature
Roots of Samkhya: Brihadaranyaka and Chandogya Upanishads
Theory of prakriti evolution, objection of logicians
The "root cause is rootless" doctrine
The chain of causality and the primary causality
Why Prakriti, not Purusha, is the material cause
The "world is not unreal" doctrine
The "why nothing come out of nothing" doctrine
The "rituals can never become the cause of moksha" doctrine
The "freedom from samsara is not the result of Karma" doctrine
The "knowledge leads to release, and this is not perishable" doctrine
Theory of "process of knowing" and three kinds of pramana (epistemology)
Theory of existent effects, what is existence and what is non-existence
The purpose of creation, the cause of successive creation
The theory of space and time
The theory of manas (mind), sensory organs, cognition, and human nature
Sources of knowledge
The rebirth doctrine
The Jivanmukti doctrine (liberation while alive) and the theory of Viveka
Fables
Review of opposite theories and objections, the Samkhya answers

The most important commentary on the text is ’s  (16th century). Other important commentaries on this text include Anirruddha's  (15th century), ’s  (c. 1600) and  ’s .

Notes

Sutras (Hinduism)
Indian philosophy
Sanskrit texts